William Sefton Moorhouse ( 1825 – 15 September 1881) was a British-born New Zealand politician. He was the second Superintendent of Canterbury Province.

Early life
Moorhouse was born in Yorkshire, England, and baptised on 18 December 1825; the oldest son of William Moorhouse, a magistrate, and his wife, Ann Carter. He trained as a lawyer, entering as a student at the Middle Temple in November 1847, and was called to the Bar in November 1860. After working for a time in London, he moved to Lyttelton, New Zealand, with his two brothers (Benjamin and Thomas) in 1851. Soon afterwards, he moved to Wellington, where he resumed his law practice.

He married Jane Ann(e) Collins on 15 December 1853 in Old St. Paul's, Wellington. He then briefly travelled to Australia, leaving with his wife on the barque Tory on 16 December for Melbourne.

He subsequently returned to Lyttelton, and then moved to Christchurch, where he acted as a lawyer, magistrate, newspaper editor, and ship owner. One of his sisters, Sarah Ann Moorhouse, married William Barnard Rhodes. Another, Lucy Ellen Sykes Moorhouse, married John Studholme. Another, Mary Moorhouse, married Thomas Henry Wigley.

Political career
Moorhouse was active both in national and provincial politics, and later was a Mayor of Wellington.

House of Representatives 

Moorhouse was elected to represent Akaroa in the 1st New Zealand Parliament, and remained an MP until his death. In his parliamentary career, he represented the Akaroa, Heathcote (a notice of election was gazetted on 12 July 1862, and the member sworn in on 14 July), Westland, Westland Boroughs, Christchurch and Ashley (elected 1879) electorates. In the 1866 election, he had won both the Mount Herbert and Westland electorates, and chose to represent the latter.  At the 21 December 1875 election, he stood in the City of Christchurch electorate for the 6th New Zealand Parliament. He was returned in third position in this three-member electorate; the other members returned in the election were Edward Richardson and Edward Cephas John Stevens.

The Westland Representation Act 1867 introduced changes to the Waimea and Westland electorates. Their areas were reassigned and four electorates formed. As a result, Westland was abolished in 1867, a new electorate (Westland Boroughs) was established, and the Act stipulated that the sitting member (Moorhouse) was transferred to it. Other new electorates, for which by-elections were to be held, were Westland North and Westland South. Moorhouse resigned from Westland Boroughs on 20 February 1868, and William Henry Harrison won the resulting by-election.

Canterbury Provincial Council
In the provincial elections of August 1853, Moorhouse stood in the Akaroa electorate for one of two positions on the Canterbury Provincial Council. There was a draw for second place and the returning officer gave his casting vote to the other candidate, Rev. William Aylmer. A week earlier, Moorhouse had stood in the same electorate for the House of Representatives and had been successful. In 1855, Moorhouse was first elected to the Canterbury Provincial Council. From March to July 1855, he represented the Akaroa electorate on the first Council. He later served as the Province's Superintendent after James FitzGerald resigned from the superintendency in October 1857 due to illness. Moorhouse and Joseph Brittan contested the vacancy, and obtained 727 and 352 votes, respectively.

During the 1857 election he supported construction of the Lyttelton Rail Tunnel although both Brittan and FitzGerald thought such a long expensive tunnel too risky for a small colony and favoured a longer rail connection via Sumner with a short tunnel or a horse tramway over Gollans Pass.

He served as Superintendent until February 1863, and another term from May 1866 to May 1868. After his first superintendency, he represented the Kaiapoi electorate as a provincial councillor from March to October 1863, and then represented the Heathcote electorate from February 1864 to May 1866. From 27 October to 17 November 1863, he was a member of the Canterbury Executive Council.

Later years
He was Mayor of Wellington in 1875, and died in Wellington on 15 September 1881. He had diabetes, and had had an operation for an abscess. After a funeral in Wellington his body was returned to Christchurch for a funeral and then burial at Riccarton. The Legislative Council adjourned as a mark of respect. A statue to him in Christchurch was proposed.

He was survived by his wife Jane and five children. The children (born from 1859 to 1867) were a son William Harold Sefton, three daughters Alice Jane, Hilda and Jessie, and a child born in 1865 whose name was not recorded on the birth entry.

Commemoration
In 1904, the South Belt or South Town Belt in Christchurch was renamed Moorhouse Avenue in honour of the former Superintendent. Each Christchurch Avenue around the central city is named for one of the former Superintendents, and it was thought appropriate to rename the South Belt for Moorhouse, as it was parallel to the railway line and continued via Ferry Road towards the railway tunnel, two projects that were closely linked to Moorhouse. The eastern continuation of the South Belt was called Junction Street or Junction Road, until its intersection with Ferry Road. In 1909, this section was incorporated into Moorhouse Avenue. Julius von Haast named the Moorhouse Range and Sefton Peak in the Southern Alps after Moorhouse. Moorhouse and Sefton Streets in the Wellington suburb of Wadestown are also named for him. A statue of Moorhouse, made by George Anderson Lawson in London in 1885, is located in the Christchurch Botanic Gardens.

Notes

References

|-

|-

|-

1825 births
1881 deaths
Mayors of Wellington
Wellington City Councillors
Members of the New Zealand House of Representatives
Members of the Canterbury Provincial Council
Members of Canterbury provincial executive councils
Superintendents of New Zealand provincial councils
19th-century New Zealand lawyers
New Zealand people in rail transport
People from Knottingley
English emigrants to New Zealand
New Zealand MPs for Christchurch electorates
New Zealand MPs for South Island electorates
Unsuccessful candidates in the 1860–1861 New Zealand general election
19th-century New Zealand politicians
Moorhouse–Rhodes family